Stephen Hilary Ngonyani (born 25 May 1956) was a Tanzanian CCM politician and Member of Parliament for Korogwe Rural constituency since 2010. 
He died at Muhimbili National Hospital (MNH) on 1 July 2018.

References

1956 births
Living people
Chama Cha Mapinduzi MPs
Tanzanian MPs 2010–2015